Popotla is a station on Line 2 of the Mexico City Metro system. It is located in the Colonia Popotla neighborhood of the Miguel Hidalgo borough of Mexico City, northwest of the city center, on the Calzada México-Tacuba. In 2019 the station had an average ridership of 10,000 passengers per day, making it the least used station on Line 2.

Name and pictogram
The name of the station comes from the neighborhood it serves: Popotla. The logo depicts an ahuehuete tree, referring to the Árbol de la Noche Triste – the "tree of the sad night" – where Spanish conquistador Hernán Cortés stopped his retreat from Tenochtitlán and cried after being defeated by Cuitláhuac in the Battle of Noche Triste. The actual tree survived until the 20th century, when it was destroyed by a fire. There is a commemorative plaque on the site where the tree used to be.

General information
The station was opened on 14 September 1970 as part of the second stretch of Line 2, from Pino Suárez to Tacuba. Metro Popotla serves the neighborhood of the same name.

From 23 April to 24 June 2020, the station was temporarily closed due to the COVID-19 pandemic in Mexico.

Ridership

Nearby
Universidad del Ejército y Fuerza Aérea, university of the Mexican Army and the Air Force

Entrances
North: Calzada México-Tacuba and Callejón de la Zanja, Popotla
North: Calzada México-Tacuba and Colegio Militar street, Popotla

See also 
 List of Mexico City metro stations

References

External links 

Popotla
Railway stations opened in 1970
1970 establishments in Mexico
Mexico City Metro stations in Miguel Hidalgo, Mexico City